Plagius is a genus of Mediterranean plants in the chamomile tribe within the daisy family.

 Species
 Plagius flosculosus (L.) Alavi & Heywood - Corsica, Sardinia
 Plagius grandis (L.) Alavi & Heywood - Algeria, Tunisia
 Plagius maghrebinus Vogt & Greuter - Morocco, Algeria, Tunisia

References

Anthemideae
Asteraceae genera